Richard Sánchez may refer to:

 Richard Sánchez (footballer, born 1994), Mexican–American footballer who plays as a goalkeeper
 Richard Sánchez (Paraguayan footballer) (born 1996), Paraguayan footballer who plays as a midfielder
 Rick Sanchez (Richard Daniel Sanchez III), a fictional character in the animated television series Rick and Morty

See also
 Ricardo Sanchez (disambiguation)